Minnukettu is an Indian Malayalam television soap opera directed by Jnanasheelan and which aired on Surya TV from 16 August 2004 to 2 January 2009 This is the first ever serial in Malayalam to cross 1000 episodes 
 Minnukettu and its title song were hit in Kerala. It was an official remake of Indian superhit Tamil television series Metti Oli.

Plot

Cast
Lead Cast
Raghavan as Keshavan Nair
Meenakshi Sunil as Lakshmi
Gayathri Priya as Ganga
 Dr.Shaju Sham as Sudhi
Anand Thrissur as Viswam
Anu Joseph as Yamuna
Dhanya Menon as Jyothi
Dr.Neeraja / Souparnika Subhash as Meera
Shanthi Williams as Janaki Amma
Sudheer Sukumaran as Unni
Arun Ghosh
 Recurring Cast
Sarath Das
Dimple Rose as Saritha
Krishna Prasad
Beena Antony
Aneesh Chirayankeezhu
Sruthi Nair as Archana
Harijith
Kottayam Pradeep
Rani
Kripa
Kalabhavan Haneef
Sreedevi
Ramesh Kurumassherry
Shobha
Kalabhavan Rahman
Meena Ganesh
T.S.Raju
Kannur Sreelatha
Sabari Nath
Anzil Rehman
Sreekkutty
M.K.Varrier
Kulappulli Leela
Indhu Kalaadharan
Jolly Eesow
Seema G. Nair
Chandrakanth
Merlin
Abhi
Sreelekha
Illikkettu Nambhoothiri
Santha Devi
Saritha Balakrishnan
Joseph Paneagaden
Ronson Vincent

Title Song

Adaptations

References

Malayalam-language television shows
2002 Indian television series debuts
Surya TV original programming
Malayalam-language television series based on Tamil-language television series